is a Prefectural Natural Park in Wakayama Prefecture, Japan. Established in 1955, the park spans the borders of the municipalities of Aridagawa and Kimino. The park's central feature is the eponymous .

See also
 National Parks of Japan
 List of Places of Scenic Beauty of Japan (Wakayama)

References

External links
  Map of Oishi Kōgen Prefectural Natural Park

Parks and gardens in Wakayama Prefecture
Aridagawa, Wakayama
Kimino, Wakayama
Protected areas established in 1955
1955 establishments in Japan